There has been a diocese centred upon the historic city of Västerås in Sweden since the Middle Ages, well before the Reformation.  The first bishop of Västerås has been considered to be David of Munktorp (died 1082) but the sources claiming that are all of late medieval origin and are disputed. Västerås had several bishops during the 12th century but they are all unknown by name.

Bishops of Västerås before and during the Reformation

Robertus 1219–1225
Magnus 1232–1258
Carolus 1258–1283
Petrus 1284–1299
Öiarus 1299
Haquinus 1299–1300
Nicolaus Catilli 1300–1308
Israel Erlandi 1309–1328
Egislus Birgeri 1329–1352
Magnus Augustini 1353–1369
Laurentius Boberg 1370
Mathias Laurentii 1371–1379
Hartlevus Hartlevi 1379–1383
Beno Henrici Korp 1383–1394
Nicolaus 1395–1403
Andreas Johannis 1403
Petrus Ingevasti 1403–1414
Ingemarus Ingevaldi 1414
Nafno Johannis Gyrstinge 1414–1421
Olaus Jacobi Knob 1421–1442
Achatius Johannis 1442–1453
Petrus Mathiae de Vallibus 1453–1454
Olaus Gunnari 1454–1461
Benedictus Magni 1461–1462
Birgerus Magni 1462–1464
Ludechinus Abelis 1465–1487
Olaus Andreae de Vallibus 1487–1501
Otto Olavi (Svinhufvud) 1501–1522
Petrus Jacobi Guti (Sunnanväder) 1523

Bishops of Västerås during and after the Reformation
Petrus Magni / Peder Månsson 1524–1534
Henricus Johannis 1534–1556
Peder Swart (Petrus Andreae Niger) 1557–1562
Johannes Nicolai Ofeegh 1562–1574
Erasmus Nicolai Arbogensis 1574–1580
Petrus Benedicti Ölandus 1583–1588
Olaus Stephani Bellinus 1589–1606
Nicolaus Petri 1606
Olaus Stephani Bellinus 1608–1618
Johannes Johannis Rudbeckius 1619–1646
Olavus Laurentii Laurelius 1647–1670
Nicolaus Johannis Rudbeckius 1670–1676
Johannes Petri Brodinus 1677–1680
Carolus Carlson 1680–1708
Petrus Malmberg 1708–1710
Matthias Iser 1711–1725
Sven Cameen 1725–1729
Nils Barchius 1731–1733
Andreas Kallsenius 1733–1750
Samuel Troilius 1751–1760
Lars Benzelstierna 1760–1800
Johan Gustaf Flodin 1800–1808
Eric Waller 1809–1811
Gustaf Murray 1811–1825
Sven Wijkman Casparsson 1829–1839
Gustaf Nibelius 1839–1849
Christian Fahlcrantz 1849–1866
Carl Olof Björling 1866–1884
Gottfrid Billing 1884–1898
Johan August Ekman 1898–1900
Nils Lövgren 1900–1920
Einar Billing 1920–1939
Johan Cullberg 1940–1962
Sven Silén 1962–1975
Arne Palmqvist 1975–1988
Claes-Bertil Ytterberg 1988–2008
Thomas Söderberg 2008-2015
Mikael Mogren 2015-

References

 Bishops of the Diocese of Västerås. Svenska kyrkan.